Bartolomeu Lourenço de Gusmão (December 1685 – 18 November 1724) was a Portuguese born in Brazil priest and naturalist, who was a pioneer of lighter-than-air airship design.

Early life
Gusmão was born at Santos, then part of the Portuguese colony of Brazil.

He began his novitiate in the Society of Jesus at Bahia when he was about fifteen years old, but left the order in 1701. He went to Portugal and found a patron at Lisbon in the person of the Marquis of Abrantes. He completed his course of study at the University of Coimbra, devoting his attention principally to philology and mathematics, but received the title of Doctor of Canon Law (related to Theology). He is said to have had a remarkable memory and a great command of languages.

Airship
In 1709 he presented a petition to King João V of Portugal, seeking royal favour for his invention of an airship, in which he expressed the greatest confidence. The contents of this petition have been preserved, together with a picture and description of his airship. Developing the ideas of Francesco Lana de Terzi, S.J., Gusmão wanted to spread a huge sail over a boat-like body like the cover of a transport wagon; the boat itself was to contain tubes through which, when there was no wind, air would be blown into the sail by means of bellows. The vessel was to be propelled by the agency of magnets which were to be encased in two hollow metal balls. The public test of the machine, which was set for 24 June 1709, did not take place. 

It is known that Gusmão was working on this principle at the public exhibition he gave before the Court on 8 August  1709, in the hall of the Casa da Índia in Lisbon, when he propelled a ball to the roof by combustion.  The king rewarded the inventor by appointing him to a professorship at Coimbra and made him a canon.  He was also one of the fifty selected as members of the Academia Real de História, founded in 1720; and in 1722 he was made chaplain to the Court. Gusmão also busied himself with other inventions, but in the meantime continued his work on his airship schemes, the idea for which he is said to have conceived while a novice at Bahia. His designs included a ship to sail in the air consisting of a triangular gas-filled pyramid, but he died without making progress.

Persecution
One account of Gusmão's work suggests that the Portuguese Inquisition forbade him to continue his aeronautic investigations and persecuted him because of them, but this is probably a later invention.  It dates, however, from at least the end of the 18th century, as the following article in the London Daily Universal Register (later The Times) of 20 October 1786, makes clear:

Contemporary documents do attest that information was laid before the Inquisition against Gusmão, but on quite another charge.  The inventor fled to Spain and fell ill of a fever, of which he died in Toledo. He wrote: Manifesto summário para os que ignoram poderse navegar pelo elemento do ar (Short Manifesto for those who are unaware that is possible to sail through the element air, 1709); and Vários modos de esgotar sem gente as naus que fazem água (Several ways of draining, without people, ships that leak water, 1710); some of his sermons also have been printed.

Legacy
In 1936, the Bartolomeu de Gusmão Airport was built in Rio de Janeiro, Brazil, by the Luftschiffbau Zeppelin to operate with the rigid airships Graf Zeppelin and Hindenburg. In 1941, it was taken over by the Brazilian Air Force and renamed Santa Cruz Air Force Base. Presently, the airport serving Araraquara is named Bartolomeu de Gusmão Airport.

In popular culture
 Passarola Rising by Azhar Abidi
 Baltasar and Blimunda by José Saramago

See also
 List of firsts in aviation
 Adelir Antônio de Carli, aka Padre Baloeiro, a Brazilian priest who died during an attempt at cluster ballooning in 2008
 List of Catholic clergy scientists

References
Daily Universal Register (The Times), Friday, Oct 20, 1786; pg. 2; Issue 560; col C
 Gusmao, Bartolomeu de. Reproduction fac-similé d'un dessin à la plume de sa description et de la pétition adressée au Jean V. (de Portugal) en langue latine et en écriture contemporaine (1709) retrouvés récemment dans les archives du Vatican du célèbre aéronef de Bartholomeu Lourenco de Gusmão "l'homme volant" portugais, né au Brésil (1685-1724) précurseur des navigateurs aériens et premier inventeur des aérostats. 1917 (Lausanne : Impr. Réunies S. A..) in French and Latin.
 Bartolomeu Lourenço de Gusmão 1685-1724 "Translated from the article which appeared on the Bartolomeu Lourenço de Gusmão page of the Brazilian Air Force website."

1685 births
1724 deaths
People from Santos, São Paulo
Portuguese scientists
18th-century Portuguese Roman Catholic priests
Former Jesuits
University of Coimbra alumni
Catholic clergy scientists
Aviation pioneers
18th-century aviation